Uk Vithun is the former minister of justice for Cambodia. He was replaced by Neav Sithong.

References

Living people
Year of birth missing (living people)
Cambodian politicians
FUNCINPEC politicians
Government ministers of Cambodia